Igor Latinović (born 6 August 1971) is a Yugoslav alpine skier. He competed in three events at the 1992 Winter Olympics.

References

External links
 

1971 births
Living people
Yugoslav male alpine skiers
Olympic alpine skiers of Yugoslavia
Alpine skiers at the 1992 Winter Olympics
Place of birth missing (living people)